Laugram is a  village and a gram panchayat in the Kotulpur CD block in the Bishnupur subdivision of the Bankura district in the state of West Bengal, India.

History

Adi Malla was the founder of the Malla dynasty, that ruled over Mallabhum for around nine centuries, and popular as the Bishnupur Raj. There is a story associated with his beginning. In 695 AD, a prince of one of the royal families of northern India made a pilgrimage with his wife to the Jagannath temple at Puri. He halted in the midst of a great forest at Laugram,  from Kotulpur. He left his wife who was about to give birth to a child in the care of a Brahmin. The wife gave birth to a son and they remained back in Laugram. When the child was around 7 years old, he started working as a cowherd. The child started showing signs of greatness and was ultimately trained as a warrior. When he was 15 years old he had no equal as a wrestler in the territory all around. It was this that earned him the sobriquet of Adi Malla, the original or unique wrestler. He became a chieftain by the grace of Raja of Padampur, near modern Joypur,  from Laugram. The Raja made him a grant of Laugram and some villages around it. There are other variants of this story.

Geography

Location

Area overview
The map alongside shows the Bishnupur subdivision of Bankura district. Physiographically, this area has fertile low lying alluvial plains. It is a predominantly rural area with 90.06% of the population living in rural areas and only 8.94% living in the urban areas. It was a part of the core area of Mallabhum.

Note: The map alongside presents some of the notable locations in the subdivision. All places marked in the map are linked in the larger full screen map.

Demographics
According to the 2011 Census of India, Laugram had a total population of 4,469, of which 2,285 (51%) were males and 2,184 (49%) were females. There were 524 persons in the age range of 0–6 years. The total number of literate persons in Laugram was 2,728 (69.15% of the population over 6 years).

Education
Lowgram Junior High School is a Bengali-medium coeducational institution established in 2008. It has facilities for teaching from class V to class VIII.

Healthcare
Laugram Karakheria primary health centre functions with 10 beds.

References

Villages in Bankura district